Lee Helen Gibson (née Alexander; born 23 September 1991) is a Scottish footballer who plays as a goalkeeper for Scottish Women's Premier League club Glasgow City and the Scotland women's national team.

Early life
Gibson was born in Rutherglen and grew up in the Stewartfield area of East Kilbride. She attended Claremont High School.

Playing career

Club
Gibson played for Glasgow City for five years, winning fourteen trophies including four consecutive domestic trebles, before signing a full-time professional contract with Swedish Damallsvenskan club Mallbackens IF in December 2015. She rejoined Glasgow City in December 2016.

She helped City progress to the quarter-finals of the 2019–20 UEFA Women's Champions League by saving three of four kicks in a penalty shootout against Brondby.

International
Gibson was first called up to the full Scotland squad in November 2015 for a Euro 2017 qualifying match against Macedonia. Still uncapped, she was named in the Scotland squad for the Euro 2017 finals. Alexander became the first choice goalkeeper for Scotland after Euro 2017, when Gemma Fay retired.

Her international debut came in a 3–0 friendly victory over Hungary in Telki on 14 September 2017, and she helped the team qualify for the 2019 FIFA Women's World Cup. An important moment in the qualifying group was when Gibson saved a penalty kick against Poland. Scotland were eliminated in the group stage of the World Cup, with Gibson playing in all three matches. In the third match, which Scotland had to win to progress, she initially saved a penalty but a retake was ordered by VAR. The retaken penalty was scored and Scotland, who had led 3–0, could only draw 3–3 with Argentina.

Personal life
She married David Gibson in May 2022, and adopted her husband's name for her next international appearance. The marriage had originally been scheduled for the summer of 2020.

Honours
Glasgow City
Scottish Women's Premier League (9): 2011, 2012, 2013, 2014, 2015, 2017, 2018, 2019, 2020–21
Scottish Women's Cup (6): 2011, 2012, 2013, 2014, 2015, 2019 
Scottish Women's Premier League Cup: 2012, 2013, 2014, 2015

References

External links

Profile at Swedish Football Association (SvFF) 

Living people
1991 births
Sportspeople from East Kilbride
Scottish women's footballers
Women's association football goalkeepers
Scotland women's international footballers
Glasgow City F.C. players
Hamilton Academical W.F.C. players
Mallbackens IF players
Scottish Women's Premier League players
Damallsvenskan players
People educated at Claremont High School (East Kilbride)
Scottish expatriate women's footballers
Scottish expatriate sportspeople in Sweden
Expatriate women's footballers in Sweden
2019 FIFA Women's World Cup players
Footballers from South Lanarkshire
UEFA Women's Euro 2017 players